The 2013–14 BCHL season was the 52nd season of the British Columbia Hockey League. (BCHL) The sixteen teams from the Interior, Island and Mainland divisions played 58 game schedules, starting with the 2013 BCHL Showcase in Chilliwack, BC.

The top teams from each division played for the Fred Page Cup, the BCHL Championship, which was won by the Coquitlam Express for the second time in club history. They would go on to finish fourth at the Western Canadian Junior A championship, the Western Canada Cup, in Dauphin, Manitoba, failing to qualify for the Royal Bank Cup in Vernon, BC.

Changes
The Coastal and Interior Conferences have been abolished. The former Interior Conference is now the Interior Division.
Two games have been added to the schedule, increasing the regular season from 56 to 58 games.
The third round of the Fred Page Cup Playoffs will now be a round robin between the three division champions.
Player awards will now only be given to one player, instead of one player from each conference.

Final standings
Note:  GP = Games Played, W = Wins, L = Losses, T = Ties, OTL = Overtime Losses, Pts = Points

Teams are listed on the official league website. 
Standings listed by eSportsDeskPro on the official league website.

2013–2014 BCHL Fred Page Cup Playoffs

Division Playoffs

Semi-final Round Robin
{| cellpadding="1" width="340px" style="font-size: 90%; border: 1px solid gray;"
|- 
! style="background: #eeeeee;" width="25" |Rank
! style="background: #eeeeee;" width="165" |Team
! style="background: #eeeeee;" width="60" |W-L
! style="background: #eeeeee;" width="30" |GF
! style="background: #eeeeee;" width="30" |GA
! style="background: #eeeeee;" width="30" |+/-
! style="background: #eeeeee;" width="30" |Points
|-
| 1 ||Vernon ||2-0||11 ||5 ||+6||4
|-
| 2 ||Coquitlam ||2-1 ||11 ||12 ||-1||4
|-
| 3 ||Victoria  ||0-3 ||10 ||15 ||-5||0
|}

NP = Not Played. Victoria was eliminated after the fourth game of the semifinal, meaning the last two games did not need to be played.

Fred Page Cup Final

*If necessary

Playoff results are listed on the official league website.

2014 Western Canada Cup
In the round robin, Coquitlam would defeat the AJHL champion Spruce Grove Saints and MJHL champion Winnipeg Blues before losing to the SJHL champion Yorkton Terriers and host Dauphin Kings. This placed them in the semifinal round against Spruce Grove, where they would lose 5–3, giving them a fourth-place finish in the tournament.

Scoring leaders
GP = Games Played, G = Goals, A = Assists, P = Points, PIM = Penalties In Minutes

Leading goaltenders
Note: GP = Games Played, Mins = Minutes Played, W = Wins, L = Losses, T = Ties, GA = Goals Against, SO = Shutouts, Sv% = Save Percentage, GAA = Goals Against Average. Regulation losses and overtime losses have been combined for total losses.

Award winners
Brett Hull Trophy (Top Scorer): Landon Smith (Salmon Arm) & Myles Fitzgerald (Victoria)
Best Defenceman: Brett Beauvais (Penticton)
Bruce Allison Memorial Trophy (Rookie of the Year): Danton Heinen (Surrey)
Bob Fenton Trophy (Most Sportsmanlike): Danton Heinen (Surrey)
Top Goldender: Jeff Smith (Powell River)
Wally Forslund Memorial Trophy (Best Goaltending Duo): Oliver Mantha & Hunter Miska (Penticton)
Vern Dye Memorial Trophy (regular-season MVP): Landon Smith (Salmon Arm)
Joe Tennant Memorial Trophy (Coach of the Year): Bobby Henderson (Langley)
Ron Boileau Memorial Trophy (Best Regular Season Record): Langley Rivermen
Fred Page Cup (League Champions): Coquitlam Express

Players selected in 2014 NHL Entry Draft
Rd4 116: Danton Heinen - Boston Bruins (Surrey Eagles)
Rd5 130: Liam Coughlin - Edmonton oilers (Vernon Vipers)
Rd5 150: Alec Dillon - Los Angeles Kings (Victoria Grizzlies)
Rd7 192: Matt Ustaski - Winnipeg Jets (Langley Rivermen)
Rd7 208: Jack Ramsey - Chicago Blackhawks (Penticton Vees)

See also
2014 Royal Bank Cup
Western Canada Cup
Mowat Cup
List of BCHL seasons
British Columbia Hockey League
Canadian Junior Hockey League
2013 in ice hockey
2014 in ice hockey

References

External links
Official website of the British Columbia Hockey League
Official website of the Canadian Junior Hockey League

BCHL
British Columbia Hockey League seasons